Chub Creek is a stream in Dakota and Goodhue counties, in the U.S. state of Minnesota.

Chub Creek was named after the chub fish.

See also
List of rivers of Minnesota

References

Rivers of Dakota County, Minnesota
Rivers of Goodhue County, Minnesota
Rivers of Minnesota